King Lear is a 1953 live television adaptation of the Shakespeare play staged by Peter Brook and starring Orson Welles. Preserved on kinescope, it aired October 18, 1953, as part of the CBS television series Omnibus, hosted by Alistair Cooke. The cast includes Micheál Mac Liammóir and Alan Badel.

Production
A heavily abridged version of the play, this production condensed the play by eliminating the characters of Edgar and Edmund. To compensate for their absence, the role of Oswald is expanded to take Edmund's part in the play's climax, and "Poor Tom" is included not as a disguised Edgar but as an actual madman.

Welles returned to America to star in this presentation.  He was guarded by IRS agents, prohibited to leave his hotel room when not at the studio, prevented from making any purchases, and the entire sum (less expenses) he earned went to his tax bill. Welles returned to England after the broadcast.

Cast
 Orson Welles … King Lear
 Natasha Parry … Cordelia
 Arnold Moss … Duke of Albany
 Bramwell Fletcher … Earl of Kent
 David J. Stewart … Oswald
 Margaret Phillips … Regan
 Beatrice Straight … Goneril
 Alan Badel … Fool
 Micheál Mac Liammóir … Poor Tom
 Frederick Worlock … Earl of Gloucester
 Scott Forbes … Duke of Cornwall
 Wesley Addy … King of France
 Fred Sadoff … Duke of Burgundy

Home media
 2010  E1 Entertainment, Region 1 DVD, February 9, 2010

References

Sources

External links
 Omnibus: King Lear at YouTube

CBS network films
Films based on King Lear
American live television shows